The Sologashvili, also known as Solagashvili (სოლაღაშვილი) or Salagashvili (სალაღაშვილი), are a Georgian noble family, known from the 15th century. They were related to the Baratashvili and possibly shared a common origin with them. 

The family came from the southern Georgian province of Samtskhe, which they left for Kartli in the 15th century. The kings of Kartli granted them the dignity of Tavadi ("prince") and estates in the valleys of Algeti and Vere as well as in the environs of Tbilisi. The Sologashvili owned the fortresses of Kojori and Ch'apala, and the monastery of Kabeni, their familial burial ground. A branch emigrated, in 1724, to the Russian Empire, where they came to be known as Salagov (Салаговы). A member of this branch was General Semyon Ivanovich Salagov (1754–1820). The Georgian Sologashvili were confirmed as princes (knyaz) of the Russian Empire in 1850.

Notable members 
 Anna Sologashvili (1882–1937), a Social-Democratic politician

References 

Toumanoff, Cyril (1967). Studies in Christian Caucasian History, p. 270. Georgetown University Press.
Bagrationi, Ioane (1768–1830). Sologhashvili (Princes of K'artli). The Brief Description of the Georgian Noble Houses.
Pyotr Dolgorukov, "Российская родословная книга" ("Russian Genealogical Book", 1855–57), pp. 481–482.

Noble families of Georgia (country)
Georgian-language surnames